Anthony (born March 9, 1949) and Nathaniel Cook (born October 25, 1958) are American serial killer brothers who committed a series of at least 9 rapes and murders of mostly couples in Toledo, Ohio, area between 1973 and 1981. Their guilt was established in the late 1990s thanks to DNA profiling, after which both brothers were convicted and sentenced to long terms of imprisonment.

Murders and other crimes
The killings began in May 1980, when the brothers attacked 24-year-old Thomas Gordon and his 18-year-old girlfriend in northern Toledo. They threatened the couple with guns, seized control of their car and held them hostage. The Cooks drove the couple to the woodlands in Lucas County, where they shot Gordon. The brothers then  raped the woman, after which they stabbed her and fled the crime scene. The girl survived, but Gordon died. 

On January 3, 1981, Anthony and Nathaniel picked up a 19-year-old hitchhiker and Michigan-native named Connie Sue Thompson. They drove Thompson out to Lucas County, where they raped and subsequently killed her. The Cooks threw her body off a bridge into a stream where it was discovered on January 17.

In February 1981, Anthony, lured 12-year-old Dawn Rene Backes into his car. Nathaniel soon joined his brother. The two men took Backes to an abandoned theater, where they raped and tortured the young girl for the next several hours. The brothers ultimately killed Backes, crushing her skull by hitting her several times on the head with a brick block. 

On March 27, Anthony attacked Scott Moulton and Denise Siotkowski, both 21, near a supermarket located in the city center. He took them  where he shot both after raping Siotkowski. In this instance, he acted without help from his younger brother.

On August 21, 1981, Anthony, again acting alone, attacked Daryl Cole and Stacy Lynn Balonek, both 21. After raping Balonek, Cook used a baseball bat he had found in her car to beat Cole, inflicting fatal brain injuries. He then killed Balonek in the same manner. Anthony hid both bodies in the trunk of the car. 

In September of that year, Anthony committed a crime in the "rich" part of the city, just two blocks away from the police station. Early in the morning, Cook confronted the passengers of a parked van, 21-year-old Todd Sabo and 20-year-old Leslie Sawicki. He tried to rape Sawicki, but she escaped and ran to call police. Sawicki then called her father Peter, a well-known businessman in Toledo, for help. Peter Sawicki arrived before police and was fatally shot by Anthony.

Cook's fingerprints were found at the crime scene. Street informants told about him, and soon after, authorities found and arrested Anthony on October 14, 1981.

Exposure
No evidence was found that could incriminate Anthony Cook in other murders, and so, in 1982, he was found guilty of killing Peter Sawicki and sentenced to life imprisonment. After his brother's conviction, Nathaniel decided to cease his criminal lifestyle, and in the following years was arrested only for minor offences. In the mid-1990s, during one of these arrests, a blood sample was taken from him. Since both brothers left biological traces while committing the crimes, in 1998, DNA testing of the samples was carried out, which showed correspondence between the killers' profiles and that of the brothers. On February 13, 1998, Nathaniel was arrested and charged with the murder of Thomas Gordon and the attempted murder of his girlfriend.

In 2000, the brothers accepted a plea bargain, pleading guilty to the murder of Gordon and describing in detail the other murders, in exchange that they wouldn't be charged with them. Ultimately, Nathaniel pleaded guilty to killing Thomas Gordon and to being complicit in the murders of Dawn Backes and Connie Thompson. Anthony pleaded guilty to 8 murders, in addition to confessing to the murder of 22-year-old Vickie Lynn Small, committed on December 20, 1973, which was never connected to the Toledo series. As was the deal, Anthony received a second life imprisonment term in April 2000, while his brother Nathaniel received a sentence of 75 years in prison, with the possibility of parole after 20 years.

Retired Toledo Police Department Detective Tom Ross said he believed the murders were racially motivated, adding that several of the victims were stalked. All of the victims were white, and the Cook brothers are black.

Aftermath
After spending 34 years behind bars, Anthony Cook filed a motion for parole in 2015, but was denied and forbidden to file another one until 2025. Nathaniel, having served 20 years, also filed a parole application in 2018. Despite protests from the victims' relatives, the court, given the terms of agreement and the deal with the judge made in 2000, found no legal basis to prevent his release and granted the request.

Nathaniel Cook was released on August 10, 2018, but his freedom is extremely limited: he's obliged to participate in rehabilitation programs for sex offenders, to wear a GPS bracelet, and is forbidden to approach places crowded by children. In 2019, information surfaced that he was living 200 meters from a school in Toledo, but after an investigation by police, it was found that Cook hadn't violated the rules and regulations, and was let off.

See also
 List of serial killers in the United States

References

20th-century African-American people
20th-century American criminals
African-American people
American male criminals
American murderers of children
American rapists
American serial killers
Brother duos
Criminal duos
Criminals from Ohio
History of Toledo, Ohio
Male serial killers
People convicted of murder by Ohio
People from Mobile, Alabama